Mohammed al-Mokhtar Soussi (1900–1963) was a Moroccan Berber scholar, politician and writer who played an important role in the years before Morocco's independence in 1956. Born in the village of Illigh (close to Tafraout), he was a soufi and an expert on the history of the Sous region and the founder of a school in Marrakesh. From 1956 to 1963 he was minister of religious affairs and member of the Crown Council in the government of Mohammed V.

Works
 L'encyclopédie Al Maâssoul (Le mielleux).
 El Illighiat (Memories of exile).
 Erramliat (collection of poems).
 Souss El Alima (history)
 El Maassoul:Tarajim (people of Souss)
 A travers Jazoula : travels
 Camp du Sud: poetry (manuscript)

See also

 Mohammed El Moustaoui
 Mohammed Awzal

References

External links
 PhD thesis, 2003, by Abdelkabir Faouzi, L’enseignement et l’éducation dans l’oeuvre de Mohamed Mokhtar Soussi dans la région du Souss (retrieved 22-9-2009)
Ahmed Boukous "Mohammed Mokhtar Soussi, figure emblématique de la difference".in Parcours d'intellectuels maghrébins : scolarité, formation, socialisation et positionnements, Paris, 1999, 
El-Adnani, Jillali, "Regionalism, Islamism, and Amazigh Identity: Translocality in the Sûs Region of Morocco according to Muhammed Mukhtar Soussi", in: Comparative Studies of South Asia, Africa and the Middle East, Volume 27, Number 1, 2007, pp. 41–51

1900 births
1963 deaths
20th-century Moroccan historians
Berber historians
Berber poets
Berber scholars
Moroccan Berber politicians
Moroccan jurists
20th-century Moroccan poets
People from Ifrane Atlas-Saghir
People from Tafraout
Shilha people